The 2017–18 Michigan Wolverines women's basketball team represents the University of Michigan during the 2017–18 NCAA Division I women's basketball season. The Wolverines, led by 6th year head coach Kim Barnes Arico, play their home games at the Crisler Center and are currently a member of the Big Ten Conference. They finished the season 23–10, 10–6 in Big Ten play to finish in sixth place. They advanced to the quarterfinals of the Big Ten women's tournament where they lost to Nebraska. They received an at-large bid to the NCAA women's tournament where they defeated Northern Colorado before losing to Baylor in the second round.

Roster

Schedule

|-
! colspan="9" style="background:#242961; color:#F7BE05;"| Exhibition

|-
! colspan="9" style="background:#242961; color:#F7BE05;"| Non-conference regular season

|-
! colspan="9" style="background:#242961; color:#F7BE05;"| Big Ten conference season

|-
! colspan="9" style="background:#242961; color:#F7BE05;"| Big Ten Women's Tournament

|-
! colspan="9" style="background:#242961; color:#F7BE05;"| NCAA Women's Tournament

Rankings

See also
 2017–18 Michigan Wolverines men's basketball team

References

Michigan
Michigan
Michigan
Michigan
Michigan Wolverines women's basketball seasons